Bedwyr Williams (born 1974) in St. Asaph is a Welsh artist. He works across varied media including drawing, painting, writing and video..

Biography
He studied at St Martins School of Art and Ateliers, Arnhem.

In 2004, he won a Paul Hamlyn Award for the Visual Arts and in 2005 he was Welsh artist-in-residence at the Venice Biennale.

He was shortlisted for the Beck's Futures prize in 2006. His work Walk a Mile in My Shoes was a rack of 41 pairs of size 13 shoes.

In 2011, Williams won the Gold Medal for Fine Art at the National Eisteddfod of Wales for his mixed media sculptures and artworks, including carved wellington boots filled with straw.

His 2011, Lionheart & Lightsout brass sculpture was installed in Swansea Kingsway by Locws international’s Art Across the City event. The sculpture commemorates two Swansea cage fighter dressed in drag on a night out, who were assaulted. The subsequent fight was documented on CCTV and became an internet hit in 2009.

For 2012 Frieze Art Fair, London, Williams presented Curator Cadaver Cake as part of Frieze Projects, in association with Grizedale Arts. In a live performance the artists conducted a live autopsy on a life-sized curator made from cake, complete with edible internal organs.

In 2013, Bedwyr Williams represented Wales in Venice as an official Collateral Event at the 55th International Art Exhibition, Venice Biennale. The Starry Messenger was presented at the Ludoteca Santa Maria Ausiliatrice, Venice and explored the relationships between stargazing and the home, the cosmos, and the role of the amateur in a professional world. The project was jointly curated by MOSTYN and Oriel Davies and supported by the Arts Council of Wales.

Bedwyr recently announced himself as being in favour of Welsh independence.

References

External links
Artist's website

Welsh contemporary artists
Welsh artists
Living people
1974 births
Welsh Eisteddfod Gold Medal winners